Novoa is a Hispanic surname of Galician origins that may refer to
António Sampaio da Nóvoa (born 1954), Portuguese psychologist
Carlos Álvarez-Nóvoa (1940–2015), Spanish theatre director, writer, actor and lecturer 
Novoa (Spanish footballer) (born 1944), full name José Manuel Díaz Novoa, Spanish football manager and former footballer
Carmen Novoa (born 1941), artist, painter, writer and poet from Uruguay
Christian Novoa (born 1991), Venezuelan football forward 
Enio Novoa (born 1986), Peruvian football midfielder 
Felipe Novoa (born 1984), Chilean judoka
Fernando de Casas Novoa, 18th-century Spanish architect
Gonzalo Novoa (born 1986), Chilean football midfielder
Gonzalo Nin Novoa, Uruguayan administrator
Gonzalo Núñez de Novoa (died 1332), Spanish Roman Catholic bishop
Joaquín Novoa (born 1983), Spanish cyclist
Jonathan Novoa (born 1981), Chilean footballer 
Joann Novoa Mossberger (born 1961), Mexican politician 
José Novoa (born 1955), Spanish handball player 
Joseph Novoa, Venezuelan-Uruguayan film director 
Juan Camilo Novoa (born 1981), Colombian boxer 
Laura Novoa (born 1969), Argentine actress 
Manny Fontenla-Novoa (born 1954), Spanish-British businessman
Matías Novoa, Chilean-Mexican actor and model
Oscar Novoa (1886–?), Chilean fencer
Oswaldo Novoa (born 1982), Mexican boxer
Rafael Novoa (born 1967), American baseball pitcher
Rafael Novoa (actor) (born 1971), Colombian actor and model
Roberto Novoa (born 1979), Dominican Republic baseball pitcher 
Rodolfo Nin Novoa (born 1948), Uruguayan politician 
Salvador Novoa (born 1937), Mexican dramatic tenor
Sergio Novoa (born 1981), Colombian football midfielder

Fictional characters 
Jax Novoa, a character from Every Witch Way
Mía Novoa, a character in the television series Grachi

Spanish-language surnames
Galician-language surnames